Men's Wives (1852) is a novel by William Makepeace Thackeray

External links 
 
 Men's wives at internet archive.

1852 British novels
Novels by William Makepeace Thackeray